The 2006–07 World Series of Poker Circuit is the third annual World Series of Poker Circuit.

Event schedule

References 

World Series of Poker Circuit
2007 in poker